Alan Charles Dawson (born 27 November 1969) is a South African cricketer who played two Test matches and 19 One Day Internationals (ODI) for South Africa as a seam bowler.

He was born in Cape Town, Cape Province. His international career lasted from 1998 to 2004, yielding 21 ODI wickets at a bowling average of 34.04 and five Test wickets at 23.39. However, both of his Tests were against bottom-ranked Bangladesh.

Dawson's best international performance occurred in the semi-final of the Commonwealth Games in Kuala Lumpur in 1998. South Africa had lost nine wickets when Dawson joined Nicky Boje at the crease. They put on a partnership to steer South Africa into the final, where they beat Australia (captained by Steve Waugh)

Dawson's best batting in first-class cricket occurred in a Supersport Series final when Western Province had lost much of their upper order and Dawson and Eric Simons rescued them to post a decent total which they defended.

In February 2020, he was named in South Africa's squad for the Over-50s Cricket World Cup in South Africa. However, the tournament was cancelled during the third round of matches due to the coronavirus pandemic.

References

External links
 

1969 births
Living people
Cape Cobras cricketers
South Africa One Day International cricketers
White South African people
South African people of British descent
South Africa Test cricketers
South African cricketers
Western Province cricketers
Cricketers at the 1998 Commonwealth Games
Cricketers at the 1999 Cricket World Cup
Commonwealth Games gold medallists for South Africa
Cricketers from Cape Town
Commonwealth Games medallists in cricket
Medallists at the 1998 Commonwealth Games